Thursday Theatre is a UK television anthology series produced by and airing on the British Broadcasting Corporation (BBC) from 1964–1965.  There were twenty-three episodes which included adaptations of the play, The Cocktail Party, by T. S. Eliot, and the novel,  The Wings of the Dove, by Henry James. The productions ranged in duration from 75 to 95 minutes.

Guest stars included John Hurt, Susannah York, Ralph Richardson, Patrick Macnee, Ron Moody and Margaret Whiting.

Productions
This table is based on records in the BBC Genome archive of the Radio Times and the BFI database. Links to the original works from which the productions were adapted are provided in the Notes column, where available. The 13 productions missing from (or incomplete in) the archives are noted according to the TV Brain database.

References

External links

British drama television series
1963 British television series debuts
1964 British television series endings
1960s British drama television series
Black-and-white British television shows
English-language television shows